The Tockwotton-Love Place Historic District in Thomasville, Georgia is a historic district which was listed on the National Register of Historic Places in 1984.

The district then included 80 contributing buildings with relatively few intrusions or non-historic buildings.  It includes two residential neighborhoods bisected by Remington Avenue: Love Place to the north and Tockwotton to the south.

Among its historic properties are:
331 Remington St. is striking with a two-story portico having a second floor porch, intersected by a first-floor full-length porch (see #11 in accompanying photos).  
"The Paxton", a historic house hotel, at 445 Remington Avenue, at the corner of South Hansell St.
The antebellum Augustine Hansell House, at 429 South Hansell Street, is separately listed on the National Register.

References

External links

Historic districts on the National Register of Historic Places in Georgia (U.S. state)
Victorian architecture in Georgia (U.S. state)
National Register of Historic Places in Thomas County, Georgia